Krzysztof Konrad Skowroński is a Polish journalist and the former director of Program 3 in Polish Radio.

References

Year of birth missing (living people)
Living people
Polish journalists
Place of birth missing (living people)